Louis Sauer (September 3, 1915 – September 1985) was an American professional basketball player. He played college basketball for Valparaiso University before playing in the National Basketball League. In the NBL, Woltzen played for the Kankakee Gallagher Trojans during the 1937–38 season and averaged 6.6 points per game.

References 

1915 births
1985 deaths
American men's basketball players
Basketball players from Illinois
Basketball players from Indiana
Centers (basketball)
Forwards (basketball)
Kankakee Gallagher Trojans players
People from Kankakee County, Illinois
Sportspeople from the Chicago metropolitan area
Valparaiso Beacons men's basketball players